This is a list of notable writers whose readership is predominantly teenagers or young adults, or adult fiction writers who have published significant works intended for teens/young adults. Examples of the author's more notable works are given here.

A

Atia Abawi: A Land of Permanent Goodbyes
Joan Abelove: Go and Come Back, Saying It Out Loud, Lost and Found
Hailey Abbott: The Secrets of Boys, Summer Boys, The Bridesmaid, The Perfect Boy
Faridah Àbíké-Íyímídé: Ace of Spades
Marguerite Abouet: Aya
Elizabeth Acevedo: The Poet X, Clap When You Land, With the Fire on High
Richard Adams: Watership Down, Shardik, The Plague Dogs
Tomi Adeyemi: Children of Blood and Bone
Alexandra Adornetto: Halo, Hades, Heaven
Renée Ahdieh: The Wrath & the Dawn, Flame in the Mist
Melissa Albert: The Hazel Wood 
Becky Albertalli: Simon vs. the Homo Sapiens Agenda, The Upside of Unrequited, Leah on the Offbeat
Louisa May Alcott: Little Women, Jo's Boys, Eight Cousins
Lloyd Alexander: The Prydain Chronicles, Westmark, The Kestrel, The Beggar Queen
Sherman Alexie: The Absolutely True Diary of a Part-Time Indian
S.K. Ali: Saints & Misfits, Love from A to Z
Isabel Allende: City of the Beasts, Kingdom of the Golden Dragon, Forest of the Pygmies
David Almond: Kit's Wilderness, Heaven Eyes, Clay
Elaine M. Alphin: Counterfeit Son
Adi Alsaid: Let's Get Lost, Never Always Sometimes
Julia Alvarez: How the García Girls Lost Their Accents, Yo!, Before We Were Free
Laurie Halse Anderson: Speak, Fever 1793, Catalyst, Prom, Twisted, Wintergirls
M. T. Anderson: Feed, The Pox Party
Jesse Andrews: Me and Earl and the Dying Girl
V. C. Andrews: Flowers in the Attic
Josephine Angelini: Starcrossed trilogy
Anthony: A Journey, through Time, with Anthony
Kim Antieau: Mercy, Unbound
Allen Appel: Twice Upon a Time
Jules Archer: The Plot to Seize the White House, The Incredible Sixties, Treason in America
Jennifer Armentrout: Covenant series, Lux series, Dark Elements series, Cursed
Kelley Armstrong: Darkest Powers
Jay Asher: Thirteen Reasons Why, The Future of Us
Amelia Atwater-Rhodes: Den of Shadows series, Kiesha'ra series
Victoria Aveyard: Red Queen
Avi: Nothing But the Truth, The True Confessions of Charlotte Doyle, Crispin: The Cross of Lead
Nafiza Azad: The Candle and the Flame

B

Natalie Babbitt: Tuck Everlasting
Helen Bailey: Electra Brown series
Catherine Banner: The Last Descendants series
Leigh Bardugo: Shadow and Bone, Six of Crows
Jennifer Lynn Barnes: The Inheritance Games series, Debutantes series, The Fixer series, The Naturals series
T. A. Barron: The Ancient One
John Barrowman and Carole Barrowman: Hollow Earth
Cat Bauer: Harley's Ninth, Harley, Like a Person
Joan Bauer: Rules of the Road, Squashed, Stand Tall, Hope Was Here
Michael Gerard Bauer: The Running Man, Don't Call Me Ishmael
L. Frank Baum: Aunt Jane's Nieces series
Patricia Beatty: Lupita Mañana, Charley Skedaddle, Eight Mules from Monterey, Bonanza Girl, Turn Homeward, Hannalee 
Margaret Bechard: Hanging onto Max, Star Hatchling, Spacer and Rat, If It Doesn't Kill You
David Belbin: Love Lessons, Festival, Denial, The Last Virgin, Dead Guilty
Clare Bell: Ratha series
Robin Benway: Far from the Tree
Steve Berman: Vintage, a Ghost Story
Julie Berry: All the Truth That's in Me
Chetan Bhagat: Five Point Someone, Revolution 2020
Tanaz Bhathena: A Girl Like That, The Beauty of the Moment
Lisa Jenn Bigelow: Hazel's Theory of Evolution
Franny Billingsley: The Folk Keeper, Chime
Holly Black: The Spiderwick Chronicles, Modern Faerie Tales, The Folk of the Air series 
Malorie Blackman: Noughts and Crosses series
Francesca Lia Block: Weetzie Bat, Witch Baby, Baby Be-Bop, Cherokee Bat and the Goat Guys
Judy Blume: Forever, Tiger Eyes, Are You There God? It's Me, Margaret
Gwenda Bond: Stranger Things: Suspicious Minds, Girl on a Wire series, Lois Lane series, Match Made in Hell series
Frank Bonham: Durango Street
Angeline Boulley: Firekeeper's Daughter
Natasha Bowen: Skin of the Sea
Tim Bowler: River Boy, Apocalypse, Starseeker
Akemi Dawn Bowman: Starfish
Alexandra Bracken: The Darkest Minds
Ann Brashares: The Sisterhood of the Traveling Pants
Liz Braswell: The Nine Lives of Chloe King series
Libba Bray: A Great and Terrible Beauty, Rebel Angels, The Sweet Far Thing, Beauty Queens, The Diviners
Heather Brewer: The Chronicles of Vladimir Tod series
Kate Brian: The Virginity Club, Private series
Rae Bridgman: The Serpent's Spell, Amber Ambrosia, Fish & Sphinx
Lauren Brooke: Heartland series, Chestnut Hill series
Kevin Brooks: Candy, Martyn Pig, The Road of the Dead
Vera Brosgol: Anya's Ghost
Roseanne A. Brown: A Song of Wraiths and Ruin
N. M. Browne: Warriors of Alavna, Wolf Blood, Shadow Web
Alyssa Brugman: Walking Naked
Annie Bryant: Beacon Street Girls series
Elizabeth C. Bunce: A Curse Dark as Gold, Thief Errant series StarCrossed, Liar's Moon
Eve Bunting: A Sudden Silence
Melvin Burgess: Junk, Doing It
Frances Hodgson Burnett: The Secret Garden, A Little Princess, Little Lord Fauntleroy
Niki Burnham: Royally Jacked, Sticky Fingers
Candace Bushnell: The Carrie Diaries
Julie Buxbaum: Tell Me Three Things, What to Say Next

C

Meg Cabot: The Mediator, 1-800-Where-R-U, The Princess Diaries, All-American Girl, Jinx
Rachel Caine: The Morganville Vampires series
Deb Caletti: The Nature of Jade, The Secret Life of Prince Charming, The Six Rules of Maybe
Kacen Callender: Felix Ever After
W. Bruce Cameron: A Dog's Purpose
Orson Scott Card: Ender's Game
Patrick Carman: Atherton: The House of Power, Skeleton Creek, Trackers
Isobelle Carmody: Obernewtyn Chronicles, Legendsong Saga
Ally Carter: The Gallagher Girls, Heist Society
Russell Gordon Carter: Three Points of Honor, The White Plume of Navarre, Patriot Lad series
Kristin Cashore: Graceling
Kiera Cass: The Selection series
Cathy Cassidy: Indigo Blue, Scarlett, Gingersnaps
Kristin Cast and P. C. Cast: House of Night series
Cecil Castellucci: Boy Proof, The Queen of Cool, Beige, Tin Star
Brian Caswell: A Cage of Butterflies, Only the Heart, Double Exposure
Betty Cavanna: Going On Sixteen, A Date for Diane, Stamp Twice for Murder
Michael Chabon: Summerland
Aidan Chambers: Dance on My Grave, Postcards from No Man's Land
Stephen Chbosky: The Perks of Being a Wallflower
Traci Chee: Sea of Ink and Gold, We Are Not Free
Alice Childress: A Hero Ain't Nothin' but a Sandwich
Cinda Williams Chima: The Heir Chronicles, The Seven Realms
Mary H.K. Choi: Emergency Contact, Permanent Record
Roshani Chokshi: The Star Touched Queen series, The Gilded Wolves series
John Christopher: Prince in Waiting trilogy, Tripods trilogy
Lucy Christopher: Stolen
Sandra Cisneros: The House on Mango Street
Cassandra Clare: The Mortal Instruments, The Infernal Devices, The Dark Artifices
Terri Clark: Breaking Up Is Hard to Do, Sleepless
Dhonielle Clayton: The Belles
Rosemary Clement-Moore: Texas Gothic, The Splendor Falls, Prom Dates from Hell, Hell Week, Highway to Hell
Ernest Cline: Ready Player One
Rachel Cohn: Gingerbread, Dash & Lily's Book of Dares
Brock Cole: The Goats
Chris Colfer: Stranger Than Fanfiction
Sneed B. Collard III: Double Eagle, Cartwheel
Christopher Collier and James Lincoln Collier: My Brother Sam Is Dead
Suzanne Collins: The Hunger Games Trilogy
Ying Chang Compestine: Revolution Is Not a Dinner Party 
Ally Condie: Matched, Crossed, Reached
Ellen Conford: Dear Lovey Hart, I Am Desperate, We Interrupt This Semester for an Important Bulletin
Pam Conrad: My Daniel
Caroline B. Cooney:  The Face on the Milk Carton, Both Sides of Time, Twenty Pageants Later, Driver's Ed
Susan Cooper: The Dark is Rising series, King of Shadows
Robert Cormier: The Chocolate War, After the First Death, The Bumblebee Flies Anyway, Fade, I Am the Cheese, Tenderness, We All Fall Down
Bruce Coville: Aliens Ate My Homework, Armageddon Summer, Fortune's Journey
John Coy: Crackback, Box Out
Sharon Creech: Walk Two Moons, Bloomability, The Wanderer, Chasing Redbird, Absolutely Normal Chaos, Ruby Holler
Linda Crew: Children of the River
Cath Crowley: Words in Deep Blue 
Chris Crutcher: Ironman, Staying Fat for Sarah Byrnes, Whale Talk, The Sledding Hill
Mike Curato: Flamer
Jane Louise Curry: The Watchers, A Stolen Life, The Black Canary
Christopher Paul Curtis: The Watsons Go to Birmingham – 1963, Bud, Not Buddy
Karen Cushman: Catherine, Called Birdy
Leah Cypess: Death Sworn, Mistwood

D

Anita Daher: Spider's Song, Two Foot Punch, Forgetting How to Breathe
Roald Dahl: The Wonderful Story of Henry Sugar and Six More, The Great Automatic Grammatizator
Maria Dahvana Headley: Magonia
Linden Dalecki: Kid B
Maureen Daly: Seventeenth Summer
Emily Danforth: The Miseducation of Cameron Post
Paula Danziger: The Cat Ate My Gymsuit, The Divorce Express
James Dashner: The Maze Runner series
Terry Davis: Vision Quest, Mysterious Ways, If Rock & Roll Were a Machine
Pieretta Dawn: The Mermaid Apprentices, The Nymph Treasury
Pamela Dean: Tam Lin, The Secret Country trilogy, The Dubious Hills
Zoey Dean: The A-List series 
Melissa de la Cruz: Blue Bloods
Tracy Deonn: Legendborn
Sarah Dessen: Dreamland, Keeping the Moon, The Truth About Forever, Lock and Key
Carl Deuker: Heart of a Champion, Runner, Gym Candy
Graham Diamond: The Thief of Kalimar, Lady of the Haven
Peter Dickinson: The Dancing Bear, Tulku, Eva, AK, The Ropemaker
Berlie Doherty: Dear Nobody, The Snake-Stone, Granny Was a Buffer Girl
Tom Dolby: The Sixth Form
Jennifer Donnelly: A Northern Light, Revolution
Siobhan Dowd: A Swift Pure Cry, Bog Child
Ann Downer: The Spellkey, The Glass Salamander, The Books of the Keepers
Jenny Downham: Before I Die
Sharon Draper: Tears of a Tiger, The Battle of Jericho, Copper Sun, Romiette and Julio
Diane Duane: Young Wizards series
Tessa Duder: Alex Quartet
Rosamond du Jardin: Practically Seventeen, Double Date, Wait for Marcy
Lois Duncan: I Know What You Did Last Summer, Killing Mr. Griffin, Summer of Fear
Jeanne DuPrau: The City of Ember

E
Jennifer Echols: Forget You, Going Too Far, Love Story, The Boys Next Door, Endless Summer, The One That I Want, Such A Rush
Sara Bergmark Elfgren: Engelsfors
Simone Elkeles: Perfect Chemistry, Rules of Attraction, Chain Reaction
Anne Emery: Dinny Gordon series, The Popular Crowd
Akwaeke Emezi: Pet

F

Nancy Yi Fan: Swordbird
Hafsah Faizal: We Hunt the Flame
Sara Farizan: If You Could Be Mine
Nancy Farmer: The Ear, the Eye and the Arm, The House of the Scorpion, The Sea of Trolls
Tim Federle: The Great American Whatever
Catherine Fisher: The Book of the Crow, The Oracle Prophecies Trilogy, Darkhenge, Corbenic, Incarceron
Becca Fitzpatrick: Hush, Hush, Crescendo, Silence
Jasper Fforde: The Last Dragonslayer
Sharon G. Flake: The Skin I'm In, Money Hungry
Paul Fleischman: Whirligig, A Fate Totally Worse than Death
Alex Flinn: Breathing Underwater, Beastly, Cloaked
Timothée de Fombelle: Toby Alone, Vango
Dennis Foon: The Longlight Legacy, Double or Nothing
Lani Forbes: Age of the Seventh Sun
Antonia Forest: Peter's Room, Thuggery Affair, The Attic Term
Gayle Forman: If I Stay, Where She Went, Just One Day, I Was Here
Paula Fox: One-Eyed Cat, The Slave Dancer
Anne Frank: The Diary of a Young Girl
E.R. Frank: Life Is Funny, America, Wrecked, Friction
Mariah Fredericks: In the Cards: Love, Crunch Time, The True Meaning of Cleavage, Head Games, The Smart Girl's Guide to Tarot, Fatal Distraction
Benedict and Nancy Freedman: Mrs. Mike
Russell Freedman: Lincoln: A Photobiography, The Life and Death of Crazy Horse, Eleanor Roosevelt: A Life Discovered
Barbara C. Freeman: The Other Face, A Haunting Air, Snow in the Maze
Mark Frost: The Paladin Prophecy
Cornelia Funke: Inkheart, The Thief Lord, Dragon Rider

G 

Jostein Gaarder: Sophie's World, The Orange Girl
Claudia Gabel: In or Out series, Romeo and Juliet and Vampires
Neil Gaiman: Coraline, The Graveyard Book
Eric Gansworth: Apple (Skin to the Core)
Jack Gantos: Joey Pigza series, Hole in My Life (autobiography of his youth)
Stephanie Garber: Caraval series
Kami Garcia: Beautiful Creatures 
Nancy Garden: Annie on My Mind, The Year They Burned the Books
Alan Garner: The Weirdstone of Brisingamen, Elidor, The Owl Service, Red Shift
Jean Craighead George: Julie of the Wolves, My Side of the Mountain, Julie
Adèle Geras: Troy, Happy Ever After, Silent Snow, Secret Snow
Gail Giles: Shattering Glass
M-E Girard: Girl Mans Up
Morris Gleitzman: Two Weeks with the Queen, Worry Warts, Puppy Fat
Anna Godbersen: Luxe series: The Luxe, Rumors, Envy, Splendor
Parke Godwin: The Tower of Beowulf
Glenda Goertzen: Lady Oak Abroad
William Golding: Lord of the Flies
Chloe Gong: These Violent Delights
Michael Grant: Gone
Claudia Gray: Firebird series, Spellcaster series, Evernight series
John Green: Looking for Alaska, An Abundance of Katherines, Paper Towns, The Fault in Our Stars, Will Grayson, Will Grayson, Turtles All the Way Down
Bette Greene: Summer of My German Soldier
Robert Joseph Greene: This High School Has Closets
John Grisham: Theodore Boone series
Robin Jones Gunn: Christy Miller series, Sierra Jensen series
Rosa Guy: The Friends, The Disappearance

H

Robin Ha: Almost American Girl
PJ Haarsma: The Softwire series
Margaret Peterson Haddix: Among the Hidden, Found
Mark Haddon: The Curious Incident of the Dog in the Night-Time
Shannon Hale: Princess Academy
Alex Hall: Ben Drowned series
Barbara Hall: Dixie Storms, House across the Cove, Tempo Change
Laurell K. Hamilton: Anita Blake, Vampire Hunter, Meredith Gentry series
Jenny Han: The Summer I Turned Pretty, To All the Boys I've Loved Before 
Victoria Hanley: Seer and the Sword series
Lisi Harrison: The Clique, Monster High
Alix E. Harrow: The Ten Thousand Doors of January, The Once and Future Witches 
Brent Hartinger: Geography Club
Rachel Hartman: Seraphina
Sonya Hartnett: Sleeping Dogs, Thursday's Child, Surrender
James Haskins (primarily an author of non-fiction): Fighting Shirley Chisholm, The Geography of Hope
Pete Hautman: Godless, Invisible
Louise Hawes: The Vanishing Point, Waiting for Christopher, Rosey in the Present Tense
Rachel Hawkins: Hex Hall series, Rebel Belle trilogy 
Lian Hearn: Across the Nightingale Floor
Robert A. Heinlein (primarily an author of science fiction): Red Planet
Claire Hennessy: Dear Diary
Nat Hentoff (primarily an author of adult non-fiction): Does This School Have Capital Punishment?
Karen Hesse: Out of the Dust, Witness (novels in verse)
Carl Hiaasen: Hoot, Flush, Scat
Brenda Hiatt: Starstruck
Charlie Higson: Young Bond 
S.E. Hinton: The Outsiders, Rumble Fish, Tex, That Was Then, This Is Now
Will Hobbs: Downriver, Far North, Crossing the Wire
Amanda Hocking: My Blood Approves Series, Switched Trilogy
Alice Hoffman: Green Angel
Nina Kiriki Hoffman (primarily an author of science fiction): A Stir of Bones, Spirits That Walk in Shadow
Linda Holeman: Promise Song, Mercy's Birds, Raspberry House Blues
Jennifer Holm: Our Only May Amelia, Boston Jane
Stevin Hoover: The Hannah Chronicles: Book One, The Door in the Floor
Cathy Hopkins: Mates, Dates series, Cinnamon Girl series
Ellen Hopkins: Crank 
Anthony Horowitz: The Power of Five series, The Diamond Brothers, Alex Rider
Erin Hunter: Warriors series, New Prophecy series, The Power of Three
Mollie Hunter: The Stronghold, A Stranger Came Ashore, Cat, Herself
Zora Neale Hurston: Their Eyes Were Watching God

I

Jordan Ifueko: Raybearer
Wendy Isdell: A Gebra Named Al, The Chemy Called Al

J
Holly Jackson: Good Girl's Guide to Murder series
Brian Jacques: Redwall series
Adiba Jaigirdar: The Henna Wars
A. M. Jenkins: Damage, Repossessed, Night Road
Alaya Dawn Johnson: The Summer Prince
Angela Johnson: Toning the Sweep, Heaven, The First Part Last
Catherine Johnson: Sawbones, The Curious Tale of the Lady Caraboo
George Matthew Johnson: All Boys Aren't Blue
Leah Johnson: You Should See Me In A Crown 
Maureen Johnson: 13 Little Blue Envelopes, The Name of the Star, Truly Devious
E. K. Johnston: Ashoka, A Thousand Nights
Carrie Jones: Need, Captivate, Entice
Diana Wynne Jones: Chrestomanci series, Dalemark Quartet, Fire and Hemlock, Power of Three, Dark Lord of Derkholm, Year of the Griffin, Deep Secret, The Merlin Conspiracy, Howl's Moving Castle, Castle in the Air, House of Many Ways
Graham Joyce: TWOC, Do the Creepy Thing, Three Ways to Snog an Alien

K

Stacey Kade: The Ghost and the Goth
Julie Kagawa: Iron Fey series, Blood of Eden series
Lauren Kate: Fallen, Torment, Passion
Amie Kaufman: Illuminae Files series, Starbound trilogy 
Marilyn Kaye: Gifted series
Brian Keaney: Jacob's Ladder, The Haunting of Nathaniel Wolfe, The Private Life of Georgia Brown
Harold Keith: Rifles for Watie
Kody Keplinger: The DUFF
M. E. Kerr:  Dinky Hocker Shoots Smack, Little Little, Night Kites, Deliver Us from Evie, Fell, Gentlehands
Mahmona Khan: Skitten Snø, Fra Oslo til Lahore, Når du minst venter det
Celine Kiernan: The Poison Throne, Into the Grey
A. S. King: Please Ignore Vera Dietz, Ask the Passengers
David Klass: Danger Zone, You Don't Know Me
Annette Curtis Klause: The Silver Kiss, Blood and Chocolate
TJ Klune: The Extraordinaries
Elizabeth Knox: Dreamhunter, Dreamquake, Mortal Fire
Ron Koertge: The Arizona Kid
E. L. Konigsburg: Silent to the Bone, The Outcasts of 19 Schuyler Place, The Mysterious Edge of the Heroic World
Alethea Kontis: Woodcutter Sisters series
Gordon Korman: Macdonald Hall series, Island series, Jake, Reinvented, No More Dead Dogs, The 39 Clues: One False Note & The Emperor's Code
Jay Kristoff: Illuminae Files series, Lifel1k3
Naomi Kritzer: Catfishing on CatNet 
Alice Kuipers: Life on the Refrigerator Door, The Worst Thing She Ever Did, 40 Things I Want To Tell You

L

Nina LaCour: Hold Still, Everything Leads to You, We Are Okay, Watch Over Me
Elizabeth Laird: Red Sky in the Morning, Jake's Tower, A Little Piece of Ground
Janet Lambert: Star Spangled Summer, Introducing Parri
Derek Landy: Skulduggery Pleasant
Lori Lansens: The Girls: A Novel
Justine Larbalestier: Magic or Madness, How to Ditch Your Fairy, Liar
Kathryn Lasky: Blood Secret, Beyond the Burning Time, True North
Iain Lawrence: Lord of the Nutcracker Men
Michael Lawrence: Aldous Lexicon or Withern Rise trilogy
Ursula K. Le Guin: A Wizard of Earthsea, Very Far Away from Anywhere Else
Madeleine L'Engle: The Time Quartet, Polly O'Keefe series, Austin family series
Mackenzi Lee: The Gentleman's Guide to Vice and Virtue
Tanith Lee: The Castle of Dark, The Claidi Journals, Piratica
Peter Lerangis: Seven Wonders series
Billie Letts: Where The Heart Is
Gail Carson Levine: The Wish, Ella Enchanted, Fairest, Dave at Night, The Two Princesses of Bamarre
David Levithan: Boy Meets Boy, The Realm of Possibility, Every Day, Will Grayson, Will Grayson
Robert Lipsyte: The Contender, The Brave, The Chief, One Fat Summer
Malinda Lo: Ash, Last Night at the Telegraph Club
E. Lockhart: We Were Liars, The Boyfriend List, The Disreputable History of Frankie Landau-Banks, 
Ruth Frances Long: The Treachery of Beautiful Things, A Crack in Everything
Maud Lovelace: Heaven to Betsy, Betsy and the Great World
Lois Lowry: The Giver, The Silent Boy, Number the Stars, Gathering Blue
Marie Lu: Legend, Prodigy, Champion, Warcross
Barry Lyga: The Astonishing Adventures of Fanboy and Goth Girl, Boy Toy
Frances Lynn: Crushed

M

Sarah J. Maas: Throne of Glass, A Court of Thorns and Roses
Carolyn Mackler: The Earth, My Butt, and Other Big Round Things, Vegan Virgin Valentine, Love and Other Four Letter Words
Tahereh Mafi: Shatter Me series
Kekla Magoon: How it Went Down, X
Michelle Magorian: A Little Love Song
Adeline Yen Mah: Falling Leaves: The Memoirs of A Unwanted Chinese Daughter, Chinese Cinderella, Chinese Cinderella and the Secret Dragon Society
Shelby Mahurin: Serpent & Dove series
Margaret Mahy: Alchemy, The Changeover
Sarra Manning: Let's Get Lost, Fashionistas series, Diary of a Crush series, Pretty Things, Guitar Girl
Keith Mansfield: Johnny Mackintosh series
Melina Marchetta: Looking For Alibrandi, Saving Francesca, On the Jellicoe Road, Finnikin of the Rock
Jan Mark: The Eclipse of the Century, Useful Idiots, Riding Tycho, Voyager
Melissa Marr: Wicked Lovely, Ink Exchange, Fragile Eternity
John Marsden: Tomorrow series
Ann M. Martin: California Diaries
Bobbie Ann Mason: In Country
Syed M. Masood: The Bad Muslim Discount, More Than Just a Pretty Face
Sue Mayfield: Drowning Anna
Norma Fox Mazer and Harry Mazer: Heartbeat
Megan McCafferty: Jessica Darling series, Bumped, Thumped
Anne McCaffrey:  Dragonriders of Pern, The Ship Who Sang, Dinosaur Planet
Norah McClintock: The Mike & Riel series, The Robyn Hunter series, The Chloe & Levesque series
Patricia McCormick: Cut, My Brother's Keeper
Lurlene McDaniel: One Last Wish, Hit and Run, Don't Die, My Love, Till Death Do Us Part
Mindy McGinnis: Be Not Far from Me, Heroine, The Female of the Species
Anthony McGowan: The Knife That Killed Me, Hello Darkness, The Truth of Things series
Seanan McGuire: Every Heart a Doorway
Sharon E. McKay: Charlie Wilcox, War Brothers, Prison Boy
Robin McKinley:  Beauty, The Hero and the Crown, Spindle's End, Rose Daughter
Anna-Marie McLemore: When the Moon Was Ours, Wild Beauty 
Lisa McMann: Wake, Fade, Gone
Karen McManus: One of Us Is Lying 
Richelle Mead: Vampire Academy series, Bloodlines, The Golden Lily
Stephen Meader: Bulldozer, Commodore's Cup, T Model Tommy
Meg Medina: Burn Baby Burn, Milagros: Girl from Away, Yaqui Delgado Wants to Kick Your Ass
O. R. Melling: The Hunter's Moon
Milton Meltzer (primarily an author of nonfiction): Underground Man
Sandhya Menon: When Dimple Met Rishi 
Melinda Metz: Roswell High, Fingerprints
Marissa Meyer: The Lunar Chronicles, Renegades
Stephenie Meyer: Twilight, New Moon, Eclipse, Breaking Dawn, The Short Second Life of Bree Tanner, The Host, Life and Death
Ben Mikaelsen:  Petey, Touching Spirit Bear
Gloria D. Miklowitz: After the Bomb
Sarah Mlynowski: Bras and Broomsticks
James Moloney: The Book of Lies, Master of the Books
Perry Moore: Hero
Kass Morgan: The 100
Lorin Morgan-Richards: A Boy Born from Mold and Other Delectable Morsels, The Goodbye Family
Jaclyn Moriarty: The Year of Secret Assignments, Feeling Sorry for Celia, The Murder of Bindy Mackenzie
Jess Mowry: Way Past Cool, Babylon Boyz
Robert Muchamore: CHERUB series
Brandon Mull: Fablehaven series, Beyonders series, The Candy Shop War, The Arcade Catastrophe, Pingo
Mike Mullin: Ashfall
Julie Murphy: Side Effects May Vary, Dumplin', Puddin'''
Walter Dean Myers: Fallen Angels, Hoops, Monster, The Mouse Rap, Outside Shot, Scorpions, Slam, Bad Boy (autobiography of his youth), Malcolm X: By Any Means NecessaryLauren Myracle: ttyl, ttfn, l8r, g8r, Rhymes with WitchesN

Beverley Naidoo: Chain of Fire, No Turning Back, Web of LiesDonna Jo Napoli: Daughter of Venice, Bound, SirenaPhyllis Reynolds Naylor: Ice, Shiloh, Alice series
Jandy Nelson: The Sky Is Everywhere, I'll Give You the SunPatrick Ness: More Than This, Chaos WalkingTrung Le Nguyen: The Magic FishWilliam Nicholson: Wind on Fire trilogy
Susin Nielsen: The Reluctant Journal of Henry K. Larsen, We Are All Made of Molecules, No Fixed AddressJennifer Niven: All the Bright PlacesGarth Nix: The Old Kingdom / Abhorsen series, The Seventh TowerJoan Lowery Nixon: The Other Side of Dark, The Name of the Game Was Murder, The HauntingAndre Norton (primarily an author of science fiction): The Stars are Ours!, Star Gate, The Beast MasterNaomi Novik: Scholomance trilogy

O
Joyce Carol Oates: Big Mouth & Ugly Girl, SexyTyne O'Connell: The Calypso Chronicles, True LovePatrick O'Connor: The Black Tiger, Mexican Road Race, The Society of FoxesScott O'Dell: Island of the Blue DolphinsNnedi Okorafor: Akata WitchDaniel José Older: ShadowshaperLauren Oliver: Delirium, Before I Fall, Panic, Vanishing Girls, ReplicaLouise O'Neill: Only Ever Yours, Asking For ItTochi Onyebuchi: War GirlsAlice Oseman: Solitaire, Radio Silence, Heartstopper, LovelessP

Christopher Paolini: Inheritance CycleEmily X.R. Pan: The Astonishing Color of AfterKevin Panetta: BloomLinda Sue Park: A Single Shard, When My Name Was Keoko, The 39 Clues: Storm WarningFrancine Pascal: Sweet Valley High, Fearless series, The Ruling ClassSonia Patel: Rani Patel in Full Effect, Jaya and Rasa: A Love Story, Bloody SeoulKatherine Paterson: Jacob Have I Loved, LyddieJames Patterson: Maximum Ride series, Witch and Wizard series, Daniel X series
Gary Paulsen: Brian's Saga, Canyons, Nightjohn, Sarny, Soldier's Heart, DogsongJackson Pearce: As You Wish, Sisters RedMary E. Pearson: A Room on Lorelei Street, The Adoration of Jenna FoxRichard Peck: A Long Way from Chicago, Princess Ashley, A Year Down YonderRobert Newton Peck: Clunie, A Day No Pigs Would Die, Extra InningsMal Peet: The Penalty, Keeper, Exposure, TamarAnna Perera: Guantanamo Boy, The Glass CollectorStephanie Perkins: Anna and the French KissJulie Anne Peters: Keeping You a Secret, Define NormalStefan Petrucha: TimeTripper, Ripper, Teen, Inc., The Rule of WonStella Pevsner: And You Give Me a Pain, Elaine, Cute is a Four-Letter WordK. M. Peyton: Flambards, The Right-Hand Man, Pennington's Seventeenth SummerSusan Beth Pfeffer: Life as We Knew It, The Dead and the GoneJames Phelan: The Last Thirteen, AloneRodman Philbrick: Freak the Mighty, The Fire PonyBen Philippe: The Field Guide to the North American TeenagerJoan Phipson: Dinko, A Tide Flowing, The Watcher in the Garden, BiancaJodi Picoult: Between the Lines, My Sister's KeeperTamora Pierce: The Song of the Lioness, The Immortals, Protector of the Small, Trickster's Choice, Trickster's Queen, Provost's Dog, Circle of Magic, The Circle OpensAprilynne Pike: WingsChristopher Pike: Chain Letter, Remember Me, AloshaDaniel Pinkwater: The Snarkout Boys and the Avocado of DeathElizabeth Marie Pope: The Sherwood Ring, The Perilous GardConnie Porter: Imani All MineSusan Price: The Sterkarm Handshake, A Sterkarm Kiss, Odin's Voice, Odin's QueenFrancine Prose (primarily an author of adult fiction): AfterAnne Provoost: Falling, My Aunt is a Pilot Whale, In the Shadow of the ArkPhilip Pullman: Sally Lockhart series, His Dark Materials trilogy

Q
Matthew Quick: Sorta Like a Rockstar, Boy21, Forgive Me, Leonard Peacock, Every Exquisite ThingDawn Quigley: Apple in the Middle, Jo Jo MakoonsR

Bali Rai: (Un)arranged Marriage, Fire City, Killing Honour, Rani & Sukh, The Crew, The Whisper, Angel Collector, The Last Taboo, The Gun, Shivers.
Janette Rallison: It's a Mall World After All, Fame, Glory, and Other Things on My To Do List, Life, Love, and the Pursuit of Free ThrowsEllen Raskin: The Westing Game, Figgs & PhantomsWilson Rawls: Where the Red Fern GrowsCarolyn Reeder: Shades of GrayCelia Rees: Witch Child, Sorceress, The Wish House, The Vanished, The Cunning Man, Pirates!David Rees: Storm Surge, Quintin's Man, In the Tent, RisksSarah Rees Brennan: The Demon's Lexicon, The Demon's CovenantPhilip Reeve: Mortal Engines Quartet, Larklight, Starcross, Here Lies ArthurKathryn Reiss: The Glass House People, Dreadful Sorry, PaperQuake, Blackthorn WinterLouise Rennison: Angus, Thongs and Full-Frontal Snogging, ...And That's When It Fell Off in My HandJason Reynolds: All American Boys, Boy in the Black Suit, Long Way Down, GhostMorton Rhue: The Wave, Asphalt Tribe, Boot CampRansom Riggs: Miss Peregrine's Home for Peculiar ChildrenAnn Rinaldi: A Break with Charity, The Last Silk Dress, Numbering All the Bones, Wolf by the EarsRick Riordan: Percy Jackson series
Thomas Rockwell: How To Eat Fried Worms, How to Fight a GirlGinny Rorby: Dolphin Sky, Hurt Go HappyMalcolm Rose: Traces series, The Death Gene, Plague, Transplant, The Tourtured WoodLiz Rosenberg: Heart and Soul, 17: A Novel in Prose PoemsMeg Rosoff: How I Live Now, Just in Case, What I WasVeronica Rossi: Under the Never Sky, Through the Ever Night, Into the Still BlueVeronica Roth: Divergent trilogy, Carve the MarkRainbow Rowell: Eleanor & Park, Fangirl, Carry OnJ. K. Rowling: Harry Potter series 
Lois Ruby: Shanghai ShadowsAnna Rutgers van der Loeff: Children on the Oregon Trail (De Kinderkaravaan)
Marie Rutkoski: The Winner's trilogy 
Cynthia Rylant: Missing May, I Had Seen Castles, God Went to Beauty SchoolS

Louis Sachar: Holes, Small StepsBenjamin Alire Sáenz: Sammy and Juliana in Hollywood, Aristotle and Dante Discover the Secrets of the UniverseFrançoise Sagan: Bonjour TristesseJ. D. Salinger: The Catcher in the Rye, Franny and ZooeyGraham Salisbury: Shark Bait, Island Boyz, Lord of the Deep, Under the Blood Red Sun, Jungle Dogs, Eyes of the EmperorLiselle Sambury: Blood Like MagicAlex Sánchez: Rainbow Boys, So Hard to Say, Getting It, The God BoxErika Sánchez: I Am Not Your Perfect Mexican DaughterBrandon Sanderson: Skyward series
Gavril Savit: Anna and the Swallow Man, The Way BackKurtis Scaletta: Mudville, Mamba Point, The Tanglewood TerrorEllen Schreiber: Vampire Kisses series
Victoria Schwab: Monsters of Verity series
Elizabeth Scott: Bloom, Perfect You, Stealing Heaven, Living Dead Girl, Something Maybe, Love You Hate You Miss YouKieran Scott: I Was a Non-Blonde Cheerleader, Geek MagnetMichael Scott: The Secrets of the Immortal Nicholas Flamel series 
Lisa See: Snow Flower and the Secret FanMarcus Sedgwick: The Book of Dead Days, The Dark Flight Down, Blood Red, Snow White, My Swordhand is SingingRuta Sepetys: Between Shades of Gray, Salt to the SeaDarren Shan: The Saga of Darren Shan (Cirque Du Freak), The Demonata, The City, The Saga of Larten CrepsleyDyan Sheldon: Confessions of a Teenage Drama QueenSara Shepard: Pretty Little Liars series, The Lying GameZoa Sherburne: Jennifer, Too Bad About the Haines GirlValerie Sherrard: Sarah's Legacy, Testify, Counting Back from Nine, The Glory WindGena Showalter: IntertwinedMark Shulman: Scrawl, Secret Hiding PlacesNeal Shusterman: The Dark Side of Nowhere, Downsiders, The Schwa Was Here, Full TiltAdam Silvera: More Happy Than Not, They Both Die at the EndMarilyn Singer: The Course of True Love Never Did Run Smooth, HorsemasterSarah Singleton: Century, Heretic, Sacrifice, The Amethyst Child, The Poison GardenAlan Lawrence Sitomer: The Hoopster, Hip Hop High School, HomeboyzWilliam Sleator (primarily high concept sci-fi): House of Stairs, Singularity, The Boy Who Reversed Himself, Interstellar PigAndrew A. Smith: Grasshopper Jungle, WingerBetty Smith: A Tree Grows in BrooklynDodie Smith: I Capture the CastleL. J. Smith: The Vampire Diaries, Night World, The Forbidden Game, The Secret Circle, Dark VisionsRoland Smith: PeakSonya Sones: What My Mother Doesn't Know, What My Girlfriend Doesn't KnowGary Soto: The Afterlife, Baseball in April and other Stories, Living Up the StreetIvan Southall: Josh, Ash Road, Hills End, To the Wild Sky, Bread and Honey, Fly West, the Simon Black series.
Beatrice Sparks (publishing as Anonymous): Go Ask Alice, Jay's JournalNicholas Sparks: The Notebook, The Last Song, Dear John, A Walk To RememberElizabeth George Speare: The Witch of Blackbird PondEleanor Spence: The October Child, A Candle for St. AntonyJerry Spinelli: There's a Girl in My Hammerlock, Crash, StargirlNancy Springer: I Am Mordred, I Am Morgan le Fay, Blood Trail, Dussie, The Boy on a Black HorseND Stevenson: NimonaCaroline Stevermer: Sorcery and Cecelia, or The Enchanted Chocolate Pot, A College of Magics, River RatsMaggie Stiefvater: The Wolves of Mercy Falls, The Raven CycleR. L. Stine: The Fear Street series
Laurie Faria Stolarz: Blue is for Nightmares, Project 17Nic Stone: Dear MartinTanya Lee Stone: A Bad Boy Can Be Good for a GirlFrancisco X. Stork: Marcelo in the Real WorldMats Strandberg: EngelsforsTodd Strasser: Boot Camp, Give a Boy a Gun, The Accident, Can't Get There from HereJonathan Stroud: The Bartimaeus Trilogy, The LeapZoe Sugg: Girl OnlineDeirdre Sullivan: Perfectly Preventable Deaths, Needlework, Tangleweed and BrineNova Ren Suma: Imaginary Girls, The Walls Around UsCourtney Summers: SadieRosemary Sutcliff: The Eagle of the Ninth, Warrior Scarlet, The Mark of the Horse LordKrystal Sutherland: Our Chemical Hearts, House of HollowTabitha Suzuma: From Where I Stand, Forbidden, HurtT

Robin Talley: Lies We Tell OurselvesSabaa Tahir: An Ember in the AshesMariko Tamaki: This One Summer, Laura Dean Keeps Breaking Up with MeJanet Tashjian: The Gospel According to Larry, Vote for LarryMildred Taylor: Roll of Thunder, Hear My Cry, Let the Circle Be Unbroken, The LandLaini Taylor: Daughter of Smoke and Bone, Strange the DreamerJean Thesman: Appointment with a Stranger, Cattail Moon, Calling the Swan, A Sea So FarAiden Thomas: Cemetery BoysAngie Thomas: The Hate U Give, On the Come UpJoyce Carol Thomas: Marked by FireRob Thomas: Rats Saw God, Green ThumbKate Thompson: Annan Water, The Beguilers, The New PolicemanJohanna Thydell: In the Ceiling the Stars Are ShiningSharon Tregenza: Tarantula TideMegan Whalen Turner: The ThiefMark Twain: The Adventures of Tom SawyerU
Ngozi Ukazu: Check, Please! 
Eleanor Updale: MontmorencyV
Vivian Vande Velde: Heir Apparent, User Unfriendly, Never Trust a Dead Man, Dragon's BaitWendelin Van Draanen: Sammy Keyes series, Flipped, The Running Dream, Wild Bird, RunawayLizzie Velásquez: Be Beautiful, Be YouSiobhan Vivian: The List, Burn for Burn trilogy (co-written with Jenny Han), The Last Boy and Girl in the WorldNed Vizzini: It's Kind of a Funny Story, Be More ChillCynthia Voigt: Homecoming, Dicey's Song, Come a Stranger, A Solitary Blue, Sons from Afar, Izzy, Willy-Nilly, Bad GirlsSeita Vuorela: Viimi, Karikko, LumiW

Judy Waite: Shopaholic, ForbiddenMelissa Walker: Violet on the Runway, Violet by Design, Violet in Private, Lovestruck SummerJeannette Walls: The Glass Castle, Half-Broke HorsesEric Walters: The Hydrofoil Mystery, Camp X, ShatteredJen Wang: The Prince and the DressmakerJames Watson: Talking in Whispers, Ticket to Prague, Justice of the DaggerCatherine Webb: Mirror Dreams, Mirror Wakes, Timekeepers, WaywalkersJean Webster: Daddy-Long-Legs, Dear EnemyElizabeth Wein: Code Name VerityDan Wells: I Am Not a Serial Killer, Partials Sequence 
Rosemary Wells: Through the Hidden DoorNancy Werlin: Are You Alone on Purpose, The Killer's Cousin, Locked Inside, Black Mirror, Double Helix, The Rules of SurvivalScott Westerfeld: Midnighters trilogy, Peeps, The Last Days, Uglies series, Leviathan series 
John Corey Whaley: Where Things Come Back 
Alex Wheatle: Liccle Bit, Crongton KnightsKiersten White: ParanormalcyYsabeau S. Wilce: The Flora Segunda seriesTerry Lee Wilde: The Vampire...In My Dreams, Deidre's SecretLili Wilkinson: ScatterheartRita Williams-Garcia: Like Sisters on the Homefront, Every Time a Rainbow Dies, No Laughter HerePam Withers: Take It to the Xtreme series, Daredevil Club, First DescentEllen Wittlinger: Heart on My Sleeve, Hard Love, What's in A NameYu Wo: ½ PrinceAllan Wolf: The Snow Fell Three Graves Deep,  The Watch That Ends the Night, New Found LandVirginia Euwer Wolff: True Believer, Making LemonadeChristopher Wooding: Broken Sky, The Haunting of Alaizabel Cray, Storm Thief, Poison, Kerosene, End GameJacqueline Woodson: Miracle's Boys, Brown Girl DreamingPatricia C. Wrede: Enchanted Forest ChroniclesRichard Wright (primarily an author of works for adults): Black Boy (autobiography of his youth)
Diana Wynne Jones: See above, Jones.

Y
Rick Yancey: The 5th WaveGene Luen Yang: American Born ChineseLaurence Yep: Liar Liar, The Lost GardenJane Yolen: The Pit Dragon Trilogy, Briar Rose, The Devil's ArithmeticHonobu Yonezawa: HyōkaDavid Yoo: Girls for Breakfast, Stop Me if You've Heard This One BeforeNicola Yoon: Everything, Everything, The Sun Is Also a StarZ

Allen Zadoff: Food, Girls, and Other Things I Can't Have, My Life, the Theater, and Other TragediesCarlos Ruiz Zafón: The Prince of Mist, MarinaTimothy Zahn: Dragonback seriesSara Zarr: Story of a Girl, How to Save a Life, Once Was LostGabrielle Zevin: Elsewhere, Memoirs of a Teenage AmnesiacKat Zhang: What's Left of MeXiran Jay Zhao: Iron WidowCecily von Ziegesar: Gossip Girl series, It Girl series 
Paul Zindel: The Pigman, The Pigman's Legacy, My Darling, My Hamburger, Pardon Me, You're Stepping on My Eyeball!, Confessions of a Teenage BaboonIbi Zoboi: American Street, PrideMarkus Zusak: The Book Thief, The Messenger''

See also

 List of children's literature writers
 Lists of writers 
 List of teen films
 Teen drama
 List of books written by teenagers

Lists of writers